Sukuti (Nepali: सुकुटी) is a dried meat product of Nepalese origin, also consumed in the Himalayan regions of India and Tibet. It is usually made from buffalo, lamb, or goat meat. It is a staple dish of the Limbu and Gurung people. It is known as Sakhekya in the Limbu language. It was used as a source of protein and also to add variety to the diet during the winter seasons in the mountain areas. Today the food is generally available among mountain communities, and thus can be consumed and sold year-round. Sukuti is one of Nepal's many meat products; and can be consumed in many ways.

History
During ritual animal sacrifice at Hindu temples, in the presence of his kin, the priest offers a buffalo before the shrine of the gods. The sacrificial buffalo is smeared with vermillion powder (abir) The blood sacrifice is given to the gods, and the head is raised in the sanctuary. The village will then process the buffalo, and as meat is a luxury in remote regions, no part of the animal will go to waste. Some meat is sent to be cooked for dinner that day, and the rest will be dried and processed later into dried strips. In Nepal, people did not always indulge in the meat before a well-off urban life with restaurants and stores. In the difficult winters, this lean dried meat came to the rescue during the supply of food.

Method
To produce sukuti, the meat of any animal or bird is cut into thin strips and the fat is carefully removed. The meat strips hang on the roof above a Chulho (wood fire smoke) to remove any moisture and to give it its distinct smokey flavor. The drying may also create an unpleasant smell, so the strips are often coated with spices such as salt, cumin, pepper, chilli powder and turmeric, sometimes ginger and garlic paste are also used before they are spread on a clean cloth to dry in the sun. This helps the meat to have an intense flavour and kept the insects at bay. Once all of the moisture is removed, and the meat is sufficiently dried, it is considered a finished product. It can also be rehydrated when it is cooked in gravy, however, it is usually consumed dry, or fried in oil.

Making and Serving
Sukuti is cooked in the kitchens so long as the Nepalese people dry meat. There are several ways to make sukuti, depending on the taste. The main methods to prepare sukuti among the people of Nepal are deep frying or grilled roasting. To make sukuti, a combination of salt, pepper, cumin, turmeric, and chilli powder are  browned on roast, then pounded into a blend. The sukuti is then mixed with these spices and fried in oil. Sukuti is versatile, often served with chopped onions and tomatoes, topped with green onions or leaves of coriander. paste. The resulting snack is served as a side dish, an appetizer, or as a side to have whilst drinking alcohol.

See also

 List of dried foods

References

Nepalese cuisine
Dried meat